The 2007 MuchMusic Video Awards were held in Toronto, Ontario at MuchMusic's headquarters on June 17, 2007, and featured performances by Fergie, Maroon 5, The Used, Avril Lavigne, Finger Eleven, Hilary Duff, and others. The most nominated artists were Billy Talent  and Nickelback with five nominations each.

Awards

Best Video
 Billy Talent — "Fallen Leaves"
 Belly f. Ginuwine — "Pressure"
 Finger Eleven — "Paralyzer"
 Nickelback — "If Everyone Cared"
 Three Days Grace — "Never Too Late"

Best Director
 George — "Lie To Me" (directed by: RT!)
 Belly f. Ginuwine — "Pressure" (directed by: RT!)
 Billy Talent — "Red Flag" (directed by: Floria Sigismondi)
 k-os — "ELEctrik HeaT – the seekwiLL" (directed by: The Love Movement f. k-os, Micah Meisner & Zeb Roc Munir)
 Sam Roberts — "Bridge to Nowhere" (directed by: David Pawsey)

Best Post-Production
 Sam Roberts — "Bridge to Nowhere" (post-production: Johnathan Legris and David Pawsey)
 Cadence Weapon — "Sharks" (post-production by: Jay Lee, Matt Bilewicz, Ross Birchall)
 In-Flight Safety — "Coast Is Clear" (post-production by: Drew Lightfoot, Tom Morrison, Marc Bachli, Kevin Kim)
 Mobile — "Dusting Down The Stars" (post-production by: Steve Mottershead)
 Hedley — "Gunnin'" (post-production by: Christian Moreton and Marc Bachli)

Best Cinematography
 Alexisonfire — "This Could Be Anywhere In The World" (Chris Sargent)
 Belly f. Ginuwine — "Pressure" (Adam Marsden)
 Billy Talent — "Red Flag" (Claudio Miranda)
 JDiggz — "Make It Hot" (Simon Shohet)
 Sam Roberts — "Bridge to Nowhere" (François Dutil)

Best Pop Video
 Hedley — "Gunnin'"''
 City and Colour — "Comin' Home"
 George — "Talk To Me"
 k-os — "Sunday Morning"
 Keshia Chanté — "2U"

MuchLOUD Best Rock Video
 Billy Talent — "Fallen Leaves"
 Alexisonfire — "This Could Be Anywhere In The World"
 Finger Eleven — "Paralyzer"
 Nickelback — "If Everyone Cared"
 Three Days Grace — "Never Too Late"

MuchVibe Best Rap Video
 Belly f. Ginuwine — "Pressure"
 Classified — "Find Out"
 JDiggz — "Make It Hot"
 k-os — "ELEctrik HeaT – the seekwiLL"
 Point Blank — "Born and Raised in the Ghetto"

Best Independent Video
 Cancer Bats — "French Immersion"
 Classified — "Find Out"
 In-Flight Safety — "Coast Is Clear"
 Ten Second Epic — "Count Yourself In"
 Tokyo Police Club — '"Cheer It On"

MuchMoreMusic Award
 Nickelback — "Far Away"
 Feist — "My Moon My Man"
 Michael Bublé — "Everything"
 Nelly Furtado — "Say It Right"
 The Tragically Hip — "In View"

Best French Video
 Malajube — "Pâte filo"
 Anodajay & Raôul Duguay — "Le Beat A Ti-Bi"
 Damien Robitaille — "Je Tombe"
 Dumas — "Au gré des saisons"
 Vulgaires Machins — "Compter les corps"

Best International Video By A Canadian
 Avril Lavigne — "Girlfriend"
 Nelly Furtado — "Say It Right"
 Nelly Furtado — "All Good Things (Come To An End)"
 Nickelback — "Far Away"
 Three Days Grace — "Pain"

Best International Video - Artist
 Fergie — "Fergalicious"
 Akon f. Eminem — "Smack That"
 Beyoncé f. Shakira — "Beautiful Liar"
 Christina Aguilera — "Candyman"
 Eminem f. 50 Cent, Cashis and Lloyd Banks — "You Don't Know"
 Gwen Stefani f. Akon — "The Sweet Escape"
 Hilary Duff — "With Love"
 Justin Timberlake — "What Goes Around...Comes Around"
 Ludacris f. Pharrell — "Money Maker"
 Rihanna f. Jay-Z — "Umbrella"

Best International Video - Group
 My Chemical Romance — "Welcome To The Black Parade"
 AFI — "Miss Murder"
 Blue October — "Hate Me"
 Evanescence — "Call Me When You're Sober"
 Fall Out Boy — "This Ain't a Scene, It's an Arms Race"
 Pussycat Dolls f. Timbaland — "Wait A Minute"
 Red Hot Chili Peppers — "Dani California"
 The Fray — "How to Save a Life"
 The Killers — "When You Were Young"
 The Used — "The Bird and the Worm"

People's Choice: Favourite International Group
 My Chemical Romance — "Welcome To The Black Parade"
 Evanescence — "Call Me When You're Sober"
 Pussycat Dolls f. Snoop Dogg — "Buttons"
 Red Hot Chili Peppers — "Dani California"
 The Killers — "When You Were Young"

People's Choice: Favourite International Artist
 Hilary Duff — "With Love"
 Akon f. Eminem — "Smack That"
 Fergie f. will.i.am — "Fergalicious"
 Gwen Stefani f. Akon — "The Sweet Escape"
 Justin Timberlake — "SexyBack"

People's Choice: Favourite Canadian Group
 Billy Talent — "Devil In A Midnight Mass"
 Alexisonfire — "This Could Be Anywhere In The World"
 Hedley — "Gunnin"
 Nickelback — "Far Away"
 Three Days Grace — "Pain"

People's Choice: Favourite Canadian Artist
 Avril Lavigne — "Girlfriend"
 City and Colour — "Comin' Home"
 George — "Talk To Me"
 k-os — "Sunday Morning"
 Nelly Furtado — "Say It Right"

Performers
Avril Lavigne ("Girlfriend")
Maroon 5 ("Makes Me Wonder")
Fergie ("Big Girls Don't Cry" and "Fergalicious")
Billy Talent ("Fallen Leaves")
The Used ("The Bird and the Worm")
Hilary Duff ("With Love")
Belly f. Ginuwine ("Pressure")
Alexisonfire ("This Could Be Anywhere In the World")
Finger Eleven ("Paralyzer")

Presenters
Maroon 5
Avril Lavigne
Hilary Duff
Hedley
Jay Manuel
Sean Avery
Ray Emery
Chris Bosh
George
Kardinal Offishall
Sam Roberts
Tara Reid
Sum 41
Joss Stone
Marianas Trench
Amber Tamblyn
Emilie de Ravin

References 

 

2007
2007 music awards
2007 in Canadian television
2007 in Canadian music